Friedel Stern (1917 Leipzig, Germany - October 29, 2006, Tel Aviv, Israel) was a German- born Israeli cartoonist and illustrator.

Biography
Friedel Stern was born in Leipzig, Germany, in 1917, eldest of four children. Her family was Jewish but not Zionist. However, when anti-Semitism began to take hold in Germany, she stopped her art studies, and, encouraged by her mother, joined the Jewish Scouts movement. She immigrated to Palestine with this group in 1936 to Kibbutz Kfar Maccabi. However, a short while later she moved to Haifa. She worked as a cook and housemaid and took evening courses in sketching with Professor Hoenich. At the end of the 1930s, she studied art and design at Bezalel art school in Jerusalem.

During the Second World War, she joined the volunteers in the Auxiliary Women’s Corps of the British Army as a nurse. In the early 1940s, she was sent to serve in the officers’ school in Gaza and joined the liberation army in Italy, where she was assigned to the camouflage unit. During the war, she sketched and illustrated scenes depicting the daily life of the British soldiers. In 1944 she showed her sketches at the exhibition “Allied Forces Artists” in Egypt. For her military service, Friedel was awarded a citation from the King of Britain.

After her release from the army, Friedel returned to Palestine and started to work as a graphic designer of maps at the Survey of Palestine, which was later to become the Measuring Department. One of her innovations was illustrating the drawing of the maps of Palestine. Such a collection of maps was published in 1953 under the title Israel in 14 Pictorial Maps.
In 1946 Friedel started to publish cartoons in the journal Bamahane. It was then that she designed her signature composed of her first name: Friedel and a star, symbolizing the meaning of her family name in German “Stern”. This signature was meant to differentiate her from Yossi Stern who was the graphics editor of the journal. Due to the success of this publication, Friedel started to publish her cartoons regularly in the newspapers Davar, Dvar Ha’Shavua and La’isha.

In the 1950s Friedel started to publish journalistic articles where she examined the Israeli society critically. For some of these articles, she disguised herself as various ethnic types. In 1956, for instance, she disguised herself as an immigrant from Morocco and was treated with DDT. For other articles, she worked as a bus ticket conductor, and as an immigrant Ulpan student etc. Her articles were always illustrated by cartoons. In 1958 she published her book In Short: Israel about a tourist’s experiences in Israel.

Parallel to her journalistic work, Friedel also worked as a graphic designer. In the 1950s and 60’s she designed posters for the Philatelist Service and the Israeli Post Office. In 1960 she created the series Air Mail Landscape 2 - a series of 10 stamps of Israel Post (the third series of airmail stamps) about Israel’s cities and sites, thus being the second female stamp designer after Miriam Karoly). Amongst her other works are congratulatory Cards for Independence Day (published by Keren Ha’Yessod in 1958), a poster for the National Insurance Institute (in the 1950s), a collection album Countries and Nations in Pictures (in the early 1960s) and a poster for the Harp Contest (in the 1960s). Her design style was based on a minimalistic geometric line, suitable for those years.

For years Friedel was the only female cartoonist in Israel and differently, from her colleagues she rarely dealt with political or military subjects. Her uniqueness was in daily life subjects, exposing the grotesque or absurd aspects of Israeli society. From the artistic point of view, Friedel’s work is characterized by a geometric line and relatively little use of color.

From 1962 and 1992 Friedel lectured in the sketching department of the Bezalel Academy. For many years she volunteered in the Organization of IDF Invalids and in Beit Ha’Lohem. For this activity, she was awarded the President’s Volunteering Award of 1999. In 2004 she was awarded the Dosh Cartoon Award.

Friedel never married. She died in Tel Aviv-Yafo in 2006, shortly before her 90th birthday and was buried at Kibbutz Einat.

Awards and recognition
Friedel's library was donated to the Beit Ariela Library in Tel Aviv. Her artistic legacy was donated in 2010 to the Israeli Cartoon and Comics Museum in Holon. Since 2012, the Museum has organized a yearly cartoon contest called “The Friedel Stern Humorist Cartoon Contest” in her memory.

Gallery

References

1917 births
2006 deaths
Israeli cartoonists
Israeli columnists
Israeli illustrators
Israeli women illustrators
Jewish emigrants from Nazi Germany to Mandatory Palestine
Israeli stamp designers
Women stamp designers
Israeli women columnists